Brian Magee vs. Mikkel Kessler was a Super Middleweight boxing contest between the defending WBA (Regular) champion Brian Magee, and the number one challenger Mikkel Kessler. The fight was given the title "Hævnens Time" (danish: Time of revenge), because Kessler had to take revenge after Magee defeated two other Danes - Mads Larsen and Rudy Markussen.

Background
Magee had won the WBA "interim" super-middleweight title in a unanimous points win over Jaime Barboza in July 2011 before defending it with a TKO over Rudy Markussen in February 2012. He was then promoted to "Regular" Champion in November with Andre Ward remaining the "Super" Champion

After his withdrawal from the Super Six World Boxing Classic tournament (and subsequent loss of his WBC world title) through injury, Kessler would beat Mehdi Bouadla by TKO and Allan Green by KO before agreeing to fight Magee

The fight
Kessler won on knockout victory in the third round, after landing three punches to the liver, which knocked out Rudy Markussen in his against Magee. Kessler won the WBA (Regular) Super Middleweight title.

Aftermath
Magee said after this fight he would fight on, but this proved to be the final fight of his career.

Kessler then had a rematch against IBF Super Middleweight Champion Carl Froch who he had narrowly beaten to win the WBC title in April 2010. He would go on to lose on points to Froch and retire.

Undercard
Confirmed bouts:

References

Boxing matches
2012 in boxing
Boxing in Denmark
Sport in Herning
2012 in Danish sport
December 2012 sports events in Europe